Alakesh Das (born 1 January 1964) is a member of the 14th Lok Sabha of India. He represents the Nabadwip constituency of West Bengal and is a member of the Communist Party of India (Marxist) (CPI(M)) political party.

References

External links
 Official biographical sketch in Parliament of India website

1964 births
Living people
Communist Party of India (Marxist) politicians from West Bengal
People from Nadia district
India MPs 2004–2009
Lok Sabha members from West Bengal
India MPs 1999–2004